Hounslow Green or Onslow Green is a hamlet on the B1008 road (historically the A130 road), located in between the villages of Barnston and Ford End, in the Uttlesford district, in the county of Essex, England. Onslow Green has a Nature Reserve with a pond.

References

External links 
 Listed buildings in Hounslow Green

Hamlets in Essex
Uttlesford